The Society for the Study of Architecture in Canada (SSAC) is a learned society devoted to the examination of the role of the built environment in Canadian society. Its membership includes structural and landscape architects, architectural historians and planners, sociologists, ethnologists, and specialists in such fields as heritage conservation and landscape history. Founded in 1974, the SSAC is currently the sole national society whose focus of interest is Canada's built environment in all its manifestations.

See also 

 Society of Architectural Historians
 Architecture of Canada
 Examination for Architects in Canada
 Gothic Revival architecture in Canada
 List of tallest buildings in Canada
 List of tallest structures in Canada
 List of old Canadian buildings
 List of heritage buildings in Vancouver
 List of oldest buildings and structures in Toronto
 Architecture of Toronto
 Architecture of Montreal
 Architecture of Ottawa
 Architecture of Quebec City
 Canadian Centre for Architecture

Footnotes 
  http://www.canada-architecture.org

External links 
SSAC

Higher education in Canada
History organizations based in Canada
Architecture associations based in Canada
Learned societies of Canada